Robert King, 6th Earl of Kingston (17 July 1804 – 16 October 1869), styled The Honourable until 1854, was an Anglo-Irish politician and peer. 

He was the son of Robert King, 1st Viscount Lorton and Lady Frances Parsons, daughter of Laurence Parsons, 1st Earl of Rosse. He was educated at Trinity College, Dublin, matriculating in 1823.

He represented Roscommon in the House of Commons of the United Kingdom between 1826 and 1830, and served as High Sheriff of Roscommon in 1836. On 20 November 1854 he succeeded to his father's titles as Viscount Lorton. On 8 September 1869 he succeeded his cousin, James King, 5th Earl of Kingston, as Earl of Kingston. Lord Kingston died the following month. 

He married Anne Gore-Booth, daughter of Sir Robert Newcomen Gore-Booth, 3rd Baronet and Hannah Irwin, on 7 December 1829. Together they had three children:
Lady Frances Isabella Anna King (died 8 October 1890)
Robert Edward King, 7th Earl of Kingston (18 October 1831 – 21 June 1871)
Henry King-Tenison, 8th Earl of Kingston (31 July 1848 – 13 January 1896)

References

1804 births
1869 deaths
Alumni of Trinity College Dublin
High Sheriffs of Roscommon
King, Robert
King, Robert
UK MPs who inherited peerages
Earls of Kingston